The Lineup may refer to: 
 The Lineup (TV series), a police drama, 1954–60, set in San Francisco
 The Lineup (film), a 1958 film directed by Don Siegel
 The Line-Up, a 1934 American film directed by  Howard Higgin
 The Lineup (website), a brand content site by Open Road Integrated Media
 The Lineup: The World's Greatest Crime Writers Tell the Inside Story of Their Greatest Detectives, a book written by Otto Penzler that won the Edgar Award (2010)